Italia Libera was an Italian veterans' organization.

It was established after World War I by members of the Italian Republican Party to organize former servicemen who had been supportive of Italy's participation in the conflict but disapproved of the larger Associazione Nazionale Combattenti (ANC) and its sympathies towards Benito Mussolini's government.

After the assassination of Giacomo Matteotti it was one of the few groups which planned for armed resistance against Fascism, and would be one of the very first organizations to be banned under the dictatorship.

Notable members
 Randolfo Pacciardi
 Giovanni Conti
 Raffaele Rossetti
 Emilio Lussu
 Carlo Rosselli
 Piero Calamandrei
 Ernesto Rossi
 Peppino, Ricciotti Jr., and Sante Garibaldi, grandsons of Giuseppe Garibaldi

Bibliography

External links
 Movimento Italia libera

Italian anti-fascists
Political history of Italy